= Keepwell agreement =

A keepwell agreement is a contract that a parent company will keep a subsidiary solvent.
